The Battle of Saint-Raphaël took place during the Haitian Revolution.

Battle 
Toussaint, pushed back to Saint-Marc, turned to Saint-Raphaël and Saint-Michel occupied by the forces of Jean-François. After two days of fighting, the two towns were taken over by the crushed Republicans and Spaniards.

From Saint-Michel, on October 21st, Toussaint writes to Lavaux:

Notes

Bibliography 
 
 
 

Conflicts in 1794
Saint-Raphaël
Saint-Raphaël
Saint-Raphaël
Haitian Revolution
1794 in France
1794 in North America